Elisabeth Veronika Mann Borgese,  (24 April 1918 – 8 February 2002) was an internationally recognized expert on maritime law and policy and the protection of the environment.  Called "the mother of the oceans", she has received the Order of Canada and awards from the governments of Austria, China, Colombia, Germany, the United Nations and the World Conservation Union. 

Elisabeth was a child of Nobel Prize–winning German author Thomas Mann and his wife Katia Mann. Born in Germany, Elisabeth experienced displacement due to the rise of the Nazi Party and became a citizen first of Czechoslovakia, then of the United States, and finally of Canada.

Elisabeth Mann Borgese worked as a senior fellow at the Center for the Study of Democratic Institutions in Santa Barbara, California and as a university professor at Dalhousie University in Halifax, Nova Scotia, Canada. She became a proponent of international cooperation and world government. In 1968, she was one of the founding members – and for a long time the only female member – of the Club of Rome.
In 1970 she organized the first international conference on the law of the sea, "Pacem in Maribus" ("Peace in the Oceans") in Malta, and helped to establish the International Ocean Institute (IOI) at the Royal University of Malta. From 1973 to 1982, Mann Borgese helped to develop the United Nations Convention on the Law of the Sea (UNCLOS). She also helped to  establish the International Tribunal for the Law of the Sea.

Family and citizenship 

Elisabeth Veronika Mann was born in Munich, Germany, the youngest daughter of Katia Pringsheim and Nobel Prize winning German author Thomas Mann.  Her uncle was novelist Heinrich Mann. Her brothers and sisters are Klaus, Erika (wife of W. H. Auden),  Golo, Monika and Michael Mann.

The Mann family left Germany after Adolf Hitler came to power, moving first to Switzerland.
On 11 February 1933, Thomas Mann and his wife Katje left Munich on what was planned as a lecture tour. Within weeks he was warned that the Nazi Party, which had recently come to power, was moving against him.  His house and possessions, his published books, and initially his royalties were confiscated. Mann was warned to remain abroad, but was dependent upon German citizenship for a valid passport. 
He began to explore the possibility of obtaining citizenship in Austria, Switzerland or Czechoslovakia.

Thomas Mann publicly indicated his opposition to the Nazi Party in an open letter to literary critic Eduard Korrodi of the Neue Zürcher Zeitung, dated 2 February 1936. On 18 August 1936, the town council of Proseč, Czechoslovakia, voted to accept Thomas Mann's application for a Certificate of Domicile. Mann's application was supported and expedited at high levels of government and as of 19 November 1936 he and other family members, including his minor children Elisabeth and Michael, were granted Czechoslovak citizenship.

Elisabeth studied piano and cello at the Conservatory of Music in Zürich, Switzerland, receiving a Bachelor of Arts degree in Classics and a diploma from the Conservatory of Music in Zurich in 1938. Among musicians, she is known for her translation of Heinrich Schenker's Harmonielehre (1906) into English.  As a result of excisions by the editor, Oswald Jonas, Mann Borgese's translation Harmony (1954) is "somewhat removed from what Schenker himself actually wrote." Nonetheless, her "rough and ready" translation was for many years one of the few versions available. 

On 10 February 1938, Thomas Mann traveled to the United States on a lecture tour.  Following the annexation of Austria on 12 March 1938, he expressed grave concern over the appeasement policy and sought to become a citizen of the United States. Elisabeth accompanied her parents to the United States.  
Following the German occupation of Czechoslovakia, their Czechoslovak passports were no longer considered valid. In 1941, Thomas Mann and other family members, including Elisabeth Mann Borgese, became citizens of the United States.

At the time of her death, Elisabeth Mann Borgese was the last living child of Thomas Mann. This came to prominence with the Emmy-winning docudrama TV mini-series Die Manns – Ein Jahrhundertroman (2001), in which she was shown in interviews with director Heinrich Breloer on different locations in Europe and the United States where her family once stayed. The Frankfurter Allgemeine Zeitung described her appearance in the interviews as "unpretentious, wise and with a winning sense of humor". It marked the first time that she talked extensively about her family, and she agreed that she was the only one of the six children of Mann who felt totally reconciled with the shadow of their father.

Marriage
Elisabeth Mann married the anti-fascist Italian writer and professor of literature Giuseppe Antonio Borgese (1882–1952) in 1939. They had two daughters, Angelica (born 1940) and Dominica (born 1944). Mann Borgese also had a foster son, Marcel Deschamp Borgese.

University of Chicago 
Mann Borgese moved to Chicago with her husband, who taught at the University of Chicago.  With Richard McKeon and Robert Hutchins, G. A. Borgese formed the interdisciplinary Committee to Frame a World Constitution, which published a Preliminary Draft of a World Constitution in 1948. The members of the Committee at the time of the publication of the Draft were, in addition to Hutchins and Borgese, Mortimer J. Adler, Stringfellow Barr, Albert Léon Guérard, Harold Innis, Erich Kahler, Wilber G. Katz, Charles Howard McIlwain, Robert Redfield, and Rexford Tugwell.   Elisabeth was the secretary of the Committee and edited its journal, Common Cause, which was published by the University of Chicago Press from 1947–1951. 
In 1952, G. A. Borgese died in Fiesole, Italy.

In the mid-1960s, Mann Borgese worked as an editor, researcher and translator in Chicago. She was editor of Intercultural Publications for the Ford Foundation from 1952 to 1964. She was for two years the executive secretary of the board of the Encyclopædia Britannica. 
She worked as a translator with Max Rheinstein, who helped to establish the study of comparative law in the United States. She assisted Rheinstein and Edward A. 
Shils in translating parts of  Max Weber's Wirtschaft und Gesellschaft, published as Max Weber On Law In Economy And Society.

She experimented with writing science fiction, publishing 
several stories in 1959, which were collected in the anthology, To Whom It May Concern (1960). The pessimism of her speculative fiction is in strong contrast to her usual optimism. In 1963, Borgese published The Ascent of Woman, a sociological work suggesting that women were in the process of becoming "men's true equals".

Elisabeth lived with psychiatrist and writer Corrado Tumiati (1885–1967) from 1953 until his death in 1967.

Center for the Study of Democratic Institutions
With Robert Hutchins and others, Elisabeth moved to the Center for the Study of Democratic Institutions in Santa Barbara, California, where she served as a senior fellow from 1964 to 1978. She wrote extensively on topics including peace, disarmament, human rights, world development, and the Law of the Sea. When the Constitution of the World was republished in 1965, Elisabeth Mann Borgese provided a critical introduction.
In 1967, she began to focus specifically on marine law, working with Wolfgang Friedmann and Arvid Pardo, then Malta's Ambassador to the United States.
In 1968, she published The Ocean Regime,  an early proposal for an international agency tasked with the care of ocean resources including the high seas and the continental shelf.
By 1970, at the age of 52, Mann Borgese had established herself as an international expert on the oceans.

She was the initiator and organizer of the first international conference on the law of the sea, held at Malta in 1970, with the title of "Pacem in Maribus" ("Peace in the Oceans"). 
She also helped to establish the International Ocean Institute (IOI).  It now has over 20 centers around the world. In connection with this work, she appeared on the syndicated version of the television game show To Tell the Truth in the spring of 1973.

She was the founder and founding senior editor of the International Ocean Institute's primary publication, The Ocean Yearbook, which first appeared in 1978.  and the editor of Ocean Frontiers (1992). She has also published short stories, children's books and a play. She was editor of Intercultural Publications from 1952 to 1964 and research associate and editor of Common Cause, at the University of Chicago (1946–52).

From 1973 to 1982, Mann Borgese formed part of the expert group of the Austrian delegation during the development of the United Nations Convention on the Law of the Sea (UNCLOS).
She acted as an advisor to Ambassador Karl Wolf, who led the Austrian Delegation to UNCLOS III.
She also helped to  establish the International Tribunal for the Law of the Sea.

Dalhousie University
In 1979, Mann Borgese accepted a one year fellowship as the Killam Senior Fellow at Dalhousie University, in Halifax, Nova Scotia, Canada.
Invited to remain,  she became professor of political science at Dalhousie in 1980, and an adjunct professor of law in 1996.  She taught  maritime law and political science, including a special international summer program for civil servants. She continued to work internationally, including consulting for international organizations such as UNIDO, UNESCO, and the World Bank.

In 1983, Elisabeth Mann Borgese became a Canadian citizen. 
She lived in an A-frame house on Sambro Head, fronting the ocean, near Sambro, Nova Scotia.

From 1987 to 1992 Mann Borgese served as chairperson of the International Centre for Ocean Development. She helped to develop programs in ocean management to train people from developing countries around the world.

Death 
Elisabeth Mann Borgese died unexpectedly on 8 February 2002, at the age of 83, during a skiing holiday in St. Moritz, Switzerland.

Awards and honors
 1982, Cross for High Merit, Government of Canada
 1988, Order of Canada, Governor General of Canada. Her citation for this award read:
	

 1987, United Nations Sasakawa Prize for the Environment
 1988, Gold Medal, Foundation for International Studies, Malta
 1992, Order of Colombia, Government of Colombia
 1993, St. Francis of Assisi International Environment Prize
 1996, Order of Merit of the Federal Republic of Germany
 1999, Gold Medal Muenchen Leuchtet, City of Munich, Germany
  1999, Caird Medal, National Maritime Museum, Greenwich, London, England
 2001, Mann Borgese was nominated, with the International Ocean Institute, for a Nobel Peace Prize, but did not receive the award. 
 2002, Großes Bundesverdienstkreuz (Commander's Cross of the Order of Merit), Government of Germany
 2018, issue of a stamp by Deutsche Post in honor of the 100th anniversary of her birth
 Medal of High Merit (Hohes Verdienstkreuz, Grosse Ehrenzeichen für Verdienste um die Republik Österreich), Government of Austria
 Friendship Award, Government of the People's Republic of China
 Member of Honour, IUCN, The World Conservation Union

Mann Borgese received a number of honorary degrees, including an honorary Doctor of Humanities from Mount St. Vincent University in Halifax (1986), one from Concordia University in Montreal in 1997, and a Doctor of Laws degree from Dalhousie University in 1998, at the age of 80.

Awards given in her name include the Elisabeth-Mann-Borgese-Meerespreis, established in 2006 by the state government of Schleswig-Holstein, Germany.

Archives
The Elisabeth Mann Borgese fonds, MS-2-744, Dalhousie University Archives, Dalhousie University were acquired through five different accessions, from the Estate of Elisabeth Mann Borgese (2002–2003), from the International Ocean Institute (2009), and from Betsy B. Baker (2013).
Digitization of the Elisabeth Mann Borgese fonds has been supported through donations from Nikolaus Gelpke.

An exhibition focusing on her life and work, "Elisabeth Mann Borgese and the Drama of the Oceans", was developed by the Lübecker Museen's Buddenbrookhaus in Lübeck, Germany, for display in 2012 and as a visiting exhibit in 2013 in Kiel and Berlin.

Published works
Mann Borgese published extensively.  In addition to works dealing with  international relations, the law of the sea, the environment, and world development, she wrote children's books, plays, and a study of animal communication.

Research and other non-fiction

Fiction
 The Immortal Fish (1957)
 For Sale, Reasonable (1959)
  "True Self" (1959)
 Twin's Wail (1959)
  "To Whom it May Concern" (1960)
 "My Own Utopia" (1961) (epilogue from The Ascent of Woman)

See also
Dohm–Mann family tree

References

External links

 Elisabeth Mann Borgese fonds, MS-2-744, Dalhousie University Archives, Dalhousie University 
 University of Chicago Library Guide to the World Movement for World Federal Government Records 1947-1951, University of Chicago
 "Elisabeth Mann-Borgese". In: FemBio (Frauen-Biographieforschung)
 Elizabeth Mann Borgese at the Internet Speculative Fiction Database

1918 births
2002 deaths
Elisabeth
People from Munich
German non-fiction writers
Jewish emigrants from Nazi Germany to the United States
Jewish Canadian writers
German people of Jewish descent
Canadian people of German-Jewish descent
Members of the Order of Canada
Academic staff of the Dalhousie University
Women ecologists
Commanders Crosses of the Order of Merit of the Federal Republic of Germany
20th-century non-fiction writers